Phyllis Irene Elizabeth Marshall (4 November 1921 – 2 February 1996) was a Canadian singer and actor. She was one of the first Canadian television stars, described by Encyclopedia of Music in Canada as a "pioneer among black Canadian performers".

Her singing career started at age 15 and included stage work in Canada and US, as well as television and radio work for CBC, CTV and the BBC.

Her 1964 LP That Girl won a Juno Award.

Early life and education 
Phyllis Irene Elizabeth Marshall was born to American parents on 4 November 1921 in Barrie, Ontario. As a child she studied piano and was a track athlete. The family moved to Toronto and she attended Runnymede secondary school.

Career 

At the age of 15 years, Marshall made her singing debut on Toronto radio station CRCT, and later performed on CBC Radio with Percy Faith. She performed in the Silver Slipper nightclub in Toronto in September 1938. Throughout the 1930s and 1940s she sung jazz, both with the Cab Calloway Orchestra touring through the US and on stage in Toronto. Starting in 1949 and through until 1952, she was a regular performer on the CBC Radio show initially called Blues for Friday later called Starlight Moods. In 1959, she appeared on a BBC television show The Phyllis Marshall Special.

Her acting career started in 1956 when she first performed at the Crest Theatre in Toronto. She appeared in a CBC production of The Amen Corner, as well as the CBC Television show Paul Bernard, Psychiatrist and the CBS/CTV show Night Heat.

In 1964, she released the jazz album That Girl which won a Juno Award.

She was one of the first Canadian television stars, and was described by Encyclopedia of Music in Canada as a "pioneer among black Canadian performers". In a CBC interview in 1960 she stated that she had never experienced racial prejudice in her career.

Family life and death 
Marshall had daughter, Sharon Lee Marshall, who worked as a model.

She married CBC staffer Ed McGibbon and lived in the Rosedale neighbourhood of Toronto, Ontario.

Marshall died on 2 February 1996 aged 74 in Toronto.

References

External links 

 Toronto Public Library photo archive

1921 births
1996 deaths
Actresses from Toronto
Canadian jazz singers
Black Canadian actresses
Juno Award winners
Musicians from Barrie
Musicians from Toronto
20th-century Canadian actresses
20th-century Black Canadian women singers